Koba is a language spoken on the Aru Islands of eastern Indonesia. It is close to Dobel, though mutual comprehension is low.

References

Aru languages
Languages of Indonesia